Abel Pêra (16 November 1891 – 27 September 1975) was a Portuguese actor based in Brazil. He was brother of the Portuguese actor Manuel Pêra.

Filmography
 Com as Calças na Mão (1975)
 Toda Nudez Será Castigada (1973)
 O Descarte (1973)
 A Filha de Madame Betina (1973)
 Eu Transo, Ela Transa (1972)
 Revólveres Não Cospem Flores (1972)
 As Quatro Chaves Mágicas (1971)
 O Enterro da Cafetina (1971)
 Vida e Glória de um Canalha (1970)
 A Penúltima Donzela (1969)
 O Bravo Guerreiro (1969)
 As Duas Faces da Moeda (1969)
 Enfim Sós...Com o Outro (1968)
 O Homem que Comprou o Mundo (1968)
 Pintando o Sete (1960)
 O Homem do Sputnik (1959)
 De Vento em Popa (1957)
 Maior Que o Ódio (1951)
 O Falso Detetive (1951)
 O Cortiço (1945)
 Romance de um Mordedor (1944)
 Samba em Berlim (1943)
 A Sedução do Garimpo (1941)
 Entra na Farra (1941)
 Cisne Branco (1940)
 E o Circo Chegou (1940)
 Onde Estás Felicidade? (1939)
 Está Tudo Aí (1939)
 Maridinho de Luxo (1938)
 João Ninguém (1936)
 O Crime dos Banhados (1914)

External links
 

1891 births
1975 deaths
People from Oliveira de Azeméis
Portuguese male film actors
Portuguese emigrants to Brazil